Expedition 64 was the 64th long-duration expedition to the International Space Station (ISS), that began on 21 October 2020 with the undocking and departure of Soyuz MS-16. The Expedition started with the three crew members launched onboard Soyuz MS-17 and reached its full complement with the arrival of SpaceX Crew-1, the first operational flight of NASA's Commercial Crew Program (CCP). As Crew-1 consists of a crew of four instead of three like the Soyuz, Expedition 64 marks the beginning of operations for crews of seven on the ISS. In the final week of the mission, Soyuz MS-18 and its three cosmonaut crew joined the mission. The expedition ended on 17 April 2021 with the departure of Soyuz MS-17.

Crew

Extravehicular activity 
Several spacewalks for Expedition 63 were planned to carry out work on the scientific and power systems on the ISS. Delays to the NASA Commercial Crew Program left Chris Cassidy as the only crew member on the US Orbital Segment (USOS) for an extended period of time. The arrival of the Crew Dragon Demo-2 mission permitted four EVAs by Cassidy and Robert Behnken to replace the remaining nickel-hydrogen batteries on the S6 Truss with new lithium-ion batteries.

The planned work for activating the Bartolomeo scientific package located on the outside of the Columbus laboratory module, delivered on SpaceX CRS-20, was postponed until Expedition 64.

Ryzhikov and Kud-Sverchkov performed a spacewalk on 18 November 2020 to conduct initial preparations for the replacement of the Pirs docking compartment by the Nauka laboratory module, which lasted 6 hours and 48 minutes. This was the first EVA to be conducted from the Poisk airlock. Coverage of the spacewalk, which NASA has designated "Russian Spacewalk #47", began at 14:30 UTC and lasted more than six hours.

During late January through early March of 2021, NASA executed five spacewalks. The 27 January spacewalk, begun at 12:28 UTC and lasting 6 hours and 56 minutes, was conducted by Hopkins and Glover to install a Ka band antenna on Columbus in preparation for Bartolomeo'''s activation, replace a pin on the Quest Joint Airlock, and remove a grapple fixture on the P4 Truss for the beginning of a series of experimental solar array wing upgrades.

The 1 February spacewalk, begun at 12:56 UTC and lasting 5 hours and 20 minutes, was conducted by Hopkins and Glover to conclude a four-year campaign, initiated by Shane Kimbrough and Peggy Whitson on Expedition 50, to replace the batteries on the Integrated Truss Structure. Hopkins and Glover also installed and upgraded  several cameras on the starboard truss, the Destiny laboratory, and the Kibo robotic arm.

The 28 February spacewalk, begun at 11:12 UTC and lasting 7 hours and 4 minutes, was conducted by Rubins and Glover to install on the P6 Truss brackets for the experimental solar array upgrades, the main materials for which launched in June 2021 aboard SpaceX CRS-22.

The 5 March spacewalk, begun at 11:37 UTC and lasting 6 hours and 56 minutes, was conducted by Rubins and Noguchi to continue the bracket installation work. They had also initially planned to deploy a new airlock cover to strengthen Quest, replace a wireless video transceiver on the Unity node, route more cables on Bartolomeo, and vent and rearrange ammonia hoses. Rubins and Noguchi abandoned the planned additional work because they encountered difficulties with several bolts during the bracket installation.

The 13 March spacewalk, begun at 13:14 UTC and lasting 6 hours and 47 minutes, was conducted by Hopkins and Glover to finish the work not taken up by Rubins and Noguchi, although they deferred installing clamps on Bartolomeo'' to a future spacewalk.

References 

Expeditions to the International Space Station
2020 in spaceflight
2021 in spaceflight